The Castaways are an American rock band from the Twin Cities in Minnesota, United States.

The band's only hit single was "Liar, Liar". Written by band leader James Donna and drummer (and band co-founder) Dennis Craswell, the song was produced by Timothy D. Kehr and released by Soma Records, reaching number 12 on the Billboard Hot 100 chart in 1965.  "Liar, Liar" was later featured in the films Good Morning, Vietnam and Lock, Stock and Two Smoking Barrels and was covered by Debbie Harry in Married to the Mob.  The Castaways performed "Liar, Liar" in the 1967 beach movie, It's a Bikini World.  Their followup, "Goodbye Babe", was another local hit, but did not break nationally.

Although the group released several more singles throughout the 1960s, they never released an album, until the appearance of their 1999 Greatest Hits compilation.

History
The original members were Jim Donna on keyboards, Robert Folschow and Roy Hensley on guitars, Dick Roby on bass guitar and vocal, and Dennis Craswell on drums. Folschow sang the distinctive falsetto vocal on "Liar, Liar", and Dick Roby contributed the scream.

Following the dissolution of the band, original drummer Dennis Craswell (co-author of the song "Liar Liar"),  went on to join Crow, a Minneapolis-based rock band of the late 1960s and early 1970s. and now plays UP North MN under the name: The Original Castaways (summers) and plays under the name: The Castaway in the Rio Grande Valley playing dances in the 55+ parks, and on South Padre Island (winters). 

In the early 1980s, Folschow and Craswell led a West Coast version of the band under the name The Castaways in Pismo Beach, California. Folschow, who was using the stage name of Bob LaRoy, played guitar and a keytar on many songs, including "Liar, Liar".  At some point, this lineup also included fellow original members Roby and Hensley, leaving Donna as the only original member not participating.

Rhythm guitarist Roy Hensley (born on December 31, 1947) died on June 8, 2005, at the age of 57, and was buried in Lewisville, Minnesota.

In 2006, all five members of the classic Castaways lineup were inducted into the Iowa Rock and Roll Hall of Fame, with the group's former producer, Timothy B. Kehr accepting the award on behalf of posthumous inductee Hensley.

Discography
Singles
"Liar, Liar" / "Sam" (1965)
"Goodbye Babe" / "A Man's Gotta Be a Man" (1965)
"She's a Girl in Love" / "Why This Should Happen to Me" (1967)
"I Feel So Fine" / "Hit the Road Jack" (1967)
"Walking in Different Circles" / "Just On High" (1968)
"Bad Hair Day" Dennis Craswell and Roy Hensley.
"Lavender Popcorn" / "What Kind of Face" (1968)

References

External links
Official website

Garage rock groups from Minnesota
Musical groups from the Twin Cities